Vokshi is a surname. Notable people with the surname include:

Albana Vokshi (born 1971), Albanian politician
Asim Vokshi (1909–1937), Albanian Kosovar soldier
Sulejman Vokshi (1815–1890), Albanian military commander and politician

Albanian-language surnames